Wallaroo is a rural locality split between the Central Highlands Region and the Aboriginal Shire of Woorabinda, Queensland, Australia.

Geography 

References 

Central Highlands Region
Aboriginal Shire of Woorabinda
Localities in Queensland